Hefei–Fuzhou high-speed railway, is a dual-track, electrified, passenger-dedicated, high-speed rail line between Hefei and Fuzhou, the provincial capitals of Anhui and Fujian, respectively. Construction began on April 27, 2010 and the line was opened on 28 June 2015. The total cost of the line was about ¥109.8 billion. The railway is part of the future Beijing–Taipei high-speed rail corridor.

Cities and towns along the route include Changlinhe, Chaohu, Wuwei, Tongling, Nanling, Jingxian, Jingde, Jixi and Huangshan in Anhui, Wuyuan and Shangrao in Jiangxi, and Wuyishan, Jian'ou, Gutian, Nanping and Minqing in Fujian.

The Hefu passenger-dedicated line (PDL) constitutes a portion of the proposed Beijing–Taipei high-speed rail corridor, which would tunnel under the Taiwan Strait from Fuzhou to the island of Taiwan. The northern section of this project is being built as the section of the Beijing-Shanghai HSR from Beijing to Bengbu. From Bengbu, a high-speed rail spur (opened on 2012-10-16), extends to Hefei, supporting 4 hour travel time from Beijing South railway station to Hefei. The Hefu PDL would then extend the line from Hefei to Fuzhou on the western shores of the Taiwan Strait. Political differences between mainland China and Taiwan complicate plans to extend the line by tunnel to Taipei.

Route
The Hefu PDL connects the Central Plain and the southeastern coast of China. It is one of several projects that the Chinese government has undertaken to develop rail infrastructure along the western shores of the Taiwan Strait. Most of the line runs through mountainous regions, including scenic areas of Huangshan and Wuyi Mountains, both UNESCO World Heritage Sites.

History
July 29, 2009: The Hefei–Fuzhou railway project is approved by the State Development and Planning Commission.
Dec. 22, 2009: Project announced by the Ministry of Railway in Zhengzhou.
April 27, 2010: Construction began on the Hefu PDL.
June 28, 2015: Line opened.

Notes

High-speed railway lines in China
Rail transport in Anhui
Rail transport in Jiangxi
Rail transport in Fujian
Railway lines opened in 2015